Mamulashvili is a Georgian surname. It may refer to
Giga Mamulashvili (born 1991), Russian former professional football player of Georgian descent
Mamuka Mamulashvili (born 1978), Georgian paramilitary unit leader who currently commands the Georgian Legion
Nona Mamulashvili (born 1977), Georgian political figure

Georgian-language surnames
Surnames of Georgian origin